Walter Colman (1600–1645) was an English Franciscan friar.

Life
Colman was born in Cannock, Staffordshire, to a noble and wealthy family. His father was also named Walter Coleman. His mother's family, the Whitgreaves, later gave asylum to Charles II in 1651 at Mosley Hall near Wolverhampton.

Young Colman left England to study at the English College, Douai. In 1625 he entered the Franciscan Order at Douai, receiving in religion the name of Christopher of St. Clare, by which he is more generally known.

Having completed his year of novitiate, he returned to England at the call of provincial superior Father John Jennings, but was immediately imprisoned because he refused to take the Oath of Allegiance. Released through the efforts of his friends, Colman went to London, where he was employed in the duties of the ministry and where, during his leisure moments, he composed , or, Death's Duel (London, 1632 or 1633), an elegant metrical treatise on death, which he dedicated to Queen Henrietta Maria, consort of Charles I.

When religious persecution broke out anew in 1641, Colman returned to England from Douai, where he had gone to regain his health. On 8 December of the same year he was brought to trial, together with six other priests, two of whom were Benedictines, the other four were members of the secular clergy. They were all condemned to be hanged, drawn, and quartered on 13 December, but through the interposition of the French ambassador the execution was stayed indefinitely. Colman lingered on in Newgate Prison for several years until 1645, when he died, exhausted by starvation and the rigours of his confinement.

Notes

Attribution
   cites:
Thaddeus, The Franciscans in England (London, 1898), 62, 72, 106
Anne Hope, Franciscan Martyrs in England (London, 1878), xi, 123 sqq
Mason, Certamen Seraphicum (Quaracchi, 1885), 211, 228
Leo, Lives of the Saints and Blessed of the Three Orders of St. Francis (Taunton, 1887), IV, 368.

References

1600 births
1645 deaths
English Catholic poets
English College, Douai alumni
English Roman Catholics
English Friars Minor
People from Cannock
Prisoners who died in England and Wales detention